Union Township is one of twelve townships in Floyd County, Iowa, USA.  As of the 2000 census, its population was 682.

Geography
According to the United States Census Bureau, Union Township covers an area of 41.16 square miles (106.59 square kilometers); of this, 40.78 square miles (105.63 square kilometers, 99.1 percent) is land and 0.37 square miles (0.97 square kilometers, 0.91 percent) is water.

Cities, towns, villages
 Marble Rock

Unincorporated towns
 Aureola at 
(This list is based on USGS data and may include former settlements.)

Adjacent townships
 Ulster Township (north)
 Saint Charles Township (northeast)
 Pleasant Grove Township (east)
 Dayton Township, Butler County (southeast)
 Coldwater Township, Butler County (south)
 Bennezette Township, Butler County (southwest)
 Scott Township (west)
 Rockford Township (northwest)

Cemeteries
The township contains these three cemeteries: Hillside, Westside and St. Mary's Catholic, Roseville, Iowa.

Major highways
  Iowa Highway 14

Rivers
 Shell Rock River

School districts
 Greene Community School District
 Rudd-Rockford-Marble Rock Community School District

Political districts
 Iowa's 4th congressional district
 State House District 14
 State Senate District 7

References
 United States Census Bureau 2008 TIGER/Line Shapefiles
 United States Board on Geographic Names (GNIS)
 United States National Atlas

External links
 US-Counties.com
 City-Data.com

Townships in Floyd County, Iowa
Townships in Iowa